Chester Nelsen (October 2, 1902 – October 4, 1987) was an American cyclist. He competed in the individual and team road race events at the 1928 Summer Olympics.

References

External links
 

1902 births
1987 deaths
American male cyclists
Olympic cyclists of the United States
Cyclists at the 1928 Summer Olympics
People from Waupaca, Wisconsin
Cyclists from Wisconsin